Robert Lawrence Manahan (August 23, 1956 – June 30, 2000) was an American actor and member of the Sound Department of Hollywood film industry. He was most recognized for being the voice of Zordon in the later two and a half seasons of the Mighty Morphin Power Rangers,  Power Rangers Zeo, several episodes of Power Rangers Turbo and Power Rangers in Space. He had also done voice-over projects for other TV shows.

In honor of his death (due to an aneurysm of the heart), episode 21 "The Fifth Crystal" of Power Rangers Lightspeed Rescue was dedicated in his memory.

Partial filmography

Actor 
You Light Up My Life (1977) as Ass't Engineer 
Mighty Morphin Power Rangers: The Movie (1995) as Zordon (voice)
Mighty Morphin Power Rangers (1993-1996, TV Series) as Zordon (voice)
Power Rangers Zeo (1996, TV Series) as Zordon / Zordonicus (voice)
Turbo: A Power Rangers Movie (1997) as Zordon (voice)
Power Rangers Turbo (1997, TV Series) as Zordon (voice)
Power Rangers in Space (1998, TV Series) as Zordon (voice) (final appearance)

Sound department 
 Jimmy Buffett: Live by the Bay (audio sweetening) (1986)
 The Return of Bruno (TV Movie) (post production audio) (1987)
 CBS Summer Playhouse (TV Series) (sound mixer - 1 episode) (1987)
 D.C. Follies (TV Series) (post-production audio - 1 episode) (1987)
 Funny, You Don't Look 200: A Constitutional Vaudeville (TV Movie documentary) (audio effects editor) (1987)
 Genesis: The Invisible Touch Tour (Documentary short) (audio sweetening) (1987)
 Caddie Woodlawn (post production sound mixer) (1987) 
 Duet (TV series) (post production audio - 5 episodes) (post production audio - 5 episodes) (1987–88)
 The Making of 'The Little Mermaid' (TV Movie documentary) (post audio) (1989)
 McGee and Me! (TV Series) (post-production audio - 7 episodes) (1989-1990) 
 American Dreamer (TV Series) (re-recording mixer) (1990)
 Red Hot and Blue (TV Movie) (audio) (1990)
 Crosby, Stills & Nash: Long Time Comin' (Video documentary) (audio) (1990)
 Goofy's Guide to Success (TV Movie) (post audio) (1990)
 Howling VI: The Freaks (re-recording mixer and sound editor) (1991)
 Supermarket Sweep (TV series) (re-recording mixer - 1 episode) (1991)
 Not of This World (re-recording mixer) (1991)
 Lifestyles of the Rich and Animated (TV Movie) (re-recording mixer and sound effects) (1991)
 Baby Talk (TV series) (re-recording mixer - 2 episodes) (1991)
 The Ride (re-recording mixer) (1991)
 Beakman's World (re-recording mixer - 78 episodes) (1991–97) 
 Jack Benny: Comedy in Bloom (TV Movie documentary) (post-production sound mixer) (1992)
 Paramount Pictures Promotional Sampler Laserdisc (Video documentary) (audio mixer) (1992)
 Martin (TV series) (re-recording mixer (16 episodes) and post production sound (2 episodes)) (1992 - 1993)
 Doppelganger (digital sound effects) (1993)
Mighty Morphin Power Rangers (re-recording mixer - 112 episodes) (1993-1995) 
 Sweet Valley High (TV series) (re-recording mixer - 6 episodes) (1994–95)
 Hudson Street (TV series) (re-recording mixer - 1 episode) (1995)
 Malcolm & Eddie (TV series) (re-recording - 11 episodes) (1996 - 1997)
 King of the Hill (re-recording mixer - 1 episode) (1997)
 The Tony Danza Show (TV Series) (re-recording -  14 episodes) (1997-1998) 
 The Net (American TV series)  (re-recording mixer - 1 episode) (1999)
 V.I.P. (TV series) (1999) (re-recording mixer - 1 episode)
 L.A. Heat (TV series) (1999) (supervising sound editor - 12 episodes)
 Dilbert (TV series) (1999-2000) ((re-recording mixer - 17 episodes)
 Falcone (TV series) (re-recording mixer) (2000) 
 The Linda McCartney Story (TV Movie) (re-recording mixer) (2000)  
 The King of Queens (re-recording mixer - 3 episodes) (2000)
 Family Law (re-recording mixer) (2000)
 James Brown: Live from the House of Blues (Video documentary) (sound) (2000)

External links

Robert L. Manahan at Find a Grave

1956 births
2000 deaths
American male voice actors
Burials at San Fernando Mission Cemetery
Male actors from Palo Alto, California
20th-century American male actors